This is a list of elections in the United Kingdom scheduled to be held in 2023. Included are local elections, by-elections on any level, referendums and internal party elections.

February 

 9 February: 2023 West Lancashire by-election

May 

 4 May: 2023 England local elections
 18 May: 2023 Northern Ireland local elections

See also 

 2023 in the United Kingdom

References 

Political timelines of the 2020s by year